Roya Sadat (born 1983) is an Afghan film producer and director. She was the first woman director in the history of Afghan cinema in the post-Taliban era, and ventured into making feature films and documentaries on the theme of injustice and restrictions imposed on women. Following the fall of the Taliban regime in the country, she made her debut feature film Three Dots. For this film she received six of nine awards which included as best director and best film. In 2003,A Letter to the President her most famous film that received many international awards,  she and her sister Alka Sadat established the Roya Film House and under this banner produced more than 30 documentaries and feature films and TV series . She is now involved to direct the opera of A Thousand Splendid Suns for the Seattle Opera and she is during pre production of her 2nd feature film Forgotten History.

Biography
Roya Sadat was born in Herat, Afghanistan in 1983, at the time of the Russian war. She studied law and political science at the Herat University and received a Bachelor of Arts degree in 2005. In 2006, she studied at the Asian Academy, Pusan for a Certificate Course in Film Direction. When she was very young, at the time the Taliban ruled in Afghanistan, women's education was a taboo. Then she and her five sisters were educated at home by her mother. She was an autodidact who educated herself by reading books authored by Syd Field in Persian-translated versions. She was very passionate about producing films. But considering restrictive atmosphere during the Taliban regime in her country she started writing scripts for plays and movies. In 1999, even during the Taliban regime, she wrote and directed a play for a theater show for a group of Afghan women. After the Taliban regime came to an end, she started making films and her first feature film as a producer and director was Three Dots, known in Afghanistan as Se noughta, or Ellipsis. She made this film in less than two weeks, in a digital video format. The film, though not a quality product, still gave an exposure to the western audience on the status of women in Afghanistan. Sadat discovered Gul Afroz for the lead role in this film even though Afroz had no formal training in acting. When Afroz was prevented by her husband and family members to act in the film she threatened to commit suicide, but she eventually acted in the film. This film received "rave reviews" around the world.Three, Two, One related in illiteracy among women of her country which was produced by her sister Alka Sadat; this was slated for screening, in 2007, in the Afghan parliament to highlight the need for approving pending legislation on this subject.this movie be a great start for her because when the human rights commission gives the rights to the film, she can buy a small camera and editing system for her sister Alka Sadat then she starts to make the documentary film. 

Her fiction film Taar wa Zakhma meaning Playing The Taar screened at the 7th IAWRT Asian Women's Film Festival 2011 deals with the tribulations of a 17-year-old girl married to a much older man. It was also screened at Kabul's First Autumn Human Rights Film Festival and received large audience appreciation.  In her film productions she generally works as scriptwriter, director, and in many other roles including music.
she direct A Letter to the President in 2017 that was the Country representative to Oscar Film Acadmay. 

In 2007, Roya also worked and direct the first Afghan TV Drama for Afghan Television Tolo TV and produced popular soap opera called the Secrets of This House'' with 50 episodes related to the current life of people of her country.

In 2003, she and her sister Alka Sadat established the first independent Afghan film company. In 2006, she pursued her studies at the Asian Film Academy in South Korea under a scholarship.
she married in 2011 her husband was literature to Kabul university cinema faculty and he also joined Roya Film House as a writer and cinematographer 
She credited with establishing the International Women's Film Festival in Afghanistan in 2013 as co-founder and president.
she directs 5 famous TV series 
Sadat was one of the jury members at the "Netpac award" for Malayalam films screened by the Malayalam Cinema, in 2014.

Bibliography

References

Living people
1983 births
Women in Afghanistan
Afghan women film producers
Afghan women film directors
Afghan film directors
Recipients of the International Women of Courage Award

Herat University alumni